The Shree Camp Hanuman Temple is one of the biggest Hanuman temples of India. It is situated in Ahmedabad Cantonment area in Shahibaug, Ahmedabad, Gujarat, India. This temple was owned by Smt. Lalitaben Dave and Smt. Shivagangaben Trivedi. Shri Gajanand was employed by them to do Sewa Puja in this temple in or around 1920.In 1952 the original owners handed over the temple for forming a charitable trust named Shri Hanumanji Mandir Camp Trust Ahmedabad. Since then the temple is owned and managed by the Trust, registered under A1427 ahmedabad.
Pandit Dwarka Prasad was one of the Pujari. His uncle Bhagawatpeasad was acting as the managing trustee for this temple. After his death on 14.04.1994 his son Vishnuprasad became managing Trustee. After his death his son Atulbhai is appointed as a trustee on 26.07.2018. Two more trustees are descendants of the original owners of this temple, namely Shri Hemantbhai Vyas and Smt. Shobhanaben Trivedi.
The temple is owned and managed by the Hanuman Mandir Camp Trust, Ahmedabad where there are 7 trustees at present. Over the above-mentioned three, there are: Parthivkumar Adhyaru is Pramukh trustee. Arunbhai Shah is Uppramukh trustee. Noted lawyer shri Sudhir Nanavati is trustee cum legal adviser and noted social worker Shri Lalajibhi Kharawal's son Shri Lochen Kharawal is a trustee.

Noted visitors have included former Prime Ministers of India Mr. Atal Bihari Vajpayee and Smt. Indira Gandhi.

History

Endowed with godly powers, Shree Hanuman was a military leader of the monkey army from Kiskinda, who aided Lord Rama in his quest to retrieve his kidnapped wife Sita from the demon king Ravanna in the Hindu epic tale Ramayana, written by the Hindu sage Valmiki.

The noble monkey warrior is much loved for his humility and wisdom, along with his unlimited strength and power. He is seen as the epitome of selfless devotion as he never took a wife for no other could replace his love for Rama and Sita. When asked to accompany the divine couple to the next world he refused to go as he wished to live in this one for as long as Rama-Sita's names were praised here by man.

Architecture 
The temple is built in Dravidian architectural style. A gold plated statue of Sri Hanuman is nestled in the inner sanctum of the temple. The whole building of the temple is beautifully carved and a provides a beautiful and calm space to the devotees to offer prayer and feel the breeze of devotion.

See also 

 The Jagannath Temple is a temple dedicated to the Hindu God Jagannath in the  city of Ahmedabad in the Gujrat state of India.
Shree Swaminarayan Mandir Kalupur (Gujarati: શ્રી સ્વામિનારાયણ મંદિર, અમદાવાદ, Devnagari: श्री स्वामिरायण मन्दिर, अहमदाबाद) is the first Temple of the Swaminarayan Sampraday, a Hindu sect.

External links
Temple website

References

Hanuman temples
Hindu temples in Ahmedabad